Guillaume Morel (1505 – 19 February 1564), French classical scholar, was born at Le Teilleul in Normandy.

After acting as proof-reader in a Paris firm, he set up for himself, and subsequently succeeded Turnebus as king's printer in 1555. His most important work was Thesaurus vocum omnium latinarum, containing a number of quotations from Latin authors, taken from hitherto unpublished manuscripts in the Paris library. He died in Paris.

References

1505 births
1564 deaths
People from Manche
French classical scholars
French printers